Jay Young is an American basketball coach. He is the current head coach of the Fairfield Stags men's basketball team.

Coaching career
A 1986 Marist College graduate, Young played lacrosse for the Red Foxes where he was an all-conference selection. Immediately after college, Young took his first basketball coaching position at Fitchburg State, followed by a stint at Salem State, then to Northeastern. In 1992 he was named the head men's basketball coach at Newbury where he guided the Nighthawks to the 1995 NJCAA Division III Final Four and was also named District VI Coach of the Year in 1995 and Region XXI Coach of the Year in 1994 and 1995. After his successful spell at Newbury, Young returned to Northeastern as an assistant coach where he stayed until 2000 when he accepted the head coaching position at New Haven. While with the Chargers he led them to a 78–66 record and two NCAA Division II Regional appearances.

In 2006, Young joined Steve Pikiell's coaching staff at Stony Brook where he would stay for 11 seasons and be a part of four America East Conference regular season championships and one NCAA Tournament appearance in 2016. When Pikiell accepted the head coaching position at Rutgers, Young followed as an assistant coach.

On April 3, 2019 Young was named the 13th head coach in Fairfield history.

Head coaching record

NCAA DII

NCAA DI

References

Living people
American men's basketball coaches
College men's basketball head coaches in the United States
Fairfield Stags men's basketball coaches
Fitchburg State Falcons men's basketball coaches
Marist College alumni
Newbury Nighthawks men's basketball coaches
Northeastern Huskies men's basketball coaches
Rutgers Scarlet Knights men's basketball coaches
Salem State Vikings men's basketball coaches
Stony Brook Seawolves men's basketball coaches
New Haven Chargers men's basketball coaches
Year of birth missing (living people)